The Justin Winsor Prize was awarded by the American Historical Association to encourage new authors to pursue the study of history in the Western Hemisphere at a time when the study of European history predominated. The award was established in 1896 and named for Justin Winsor (1831–1896), one of the founders and presidents of the American Historical Association and the long-time Librarian of Harvard University. The award was discontinued in 1938.  The American Historical Association's Justin Winsor Prize is not to be confused with the present-day Justin Winsor Prize awarded annually by the Library History Round Table of the American Library Association for the best library history essay.

Award winners
Annual awards
1896 Herman Vandenburg Ames, The Proposed Amendments to the Constitution of the United States
1897 No award
1898 No award
1899 No award
1900 William A. Schaper, Sectionalism and Representation in South Carolina
1901 Ulrich B. Phillips, (1877–1934) Georgia and State Rights
1902 Charles McCarthy, (1873–1921) The Anti-Masonic Party
1903 Louise Phelps Kellogg, (1862–1942) The American Colonial Charter; A Study of Its Relation to English Administration, Chiefly After 1688
1904 William R. Manning, The Nootka Sound Controversy
1905 No award
1906 Annie Heloise Abel Henderson , (1860–1939)The History of Events Resulting in Indian Consolidation West of the Mississippi River
Biennial awards
1908 Clarence Edwin Carter, Great Britain and the Illinois Country, 1765–1774
1910 Edward Raymond Turner, (1881–1929) The Negro in Pennsylvania; Slavery—Servitude—Freedom, 1639–1861
1912 Arthur Charles Cole, (1886–1976)The Whig Party in the South
1914 Mary Wilhelmine Williams, (1878–1944) Anglo-American Isthmian Diplomacy, 1815–1915
1916 Richard J. Purcell, Connecticut in Transition, 1775–1818
1918 Arthur M. Schlesinger, (1888–1965) The Colonial Merchants and the American Revolution, 1736–1776
1920 Frank Lee Benns, (1889–1867) The American Struggle for the British West India Carrying Trade, 1815–1830
1922 Lawrence Henry Gipson, (1880–1971) Jared Ingersoll: A Study of American Loyalism in Relation to British Colonial Government
1924 Elizabeth B. White, History of Franco-American Diplomatic Relations
1926 Lowell Joseph Ragatz, (1897–1978) The Fall of the Planter Class in the British Caribbean, 1763–1833 
1928 Fred Albert Shannon, (1893–1963) The Organization and Administration of the Union Army, 1861–1865, 2 vols
1930 L.W. Labaree, Royal Government in America: A Study of the British Colonial System Before 1783
Reinstituted award
1937 Carl Bridenbaugh, (1903–1992) Cities in the Wilderness: The First Century of Urban. Life in America, 1625–1742

See also

 List of history awards

External links
Justin Winsor Prize (1896–1930 and 1936–1938) American Historical Association

American Historical Association book prizes
American history awards
American non-fiction literary awards
Awards established in 1896
Awards disestablished in 1938
1896 establishments in the United States
1938 disestablishments in the United States